Doce was a Portuguese female band from the 1980s. It was one of the first girl bands in Europe.

The girls took part in the Portuguese national final in order to represent the country in the Eurovision Song Contest 1980 with the song "Doce" ("Sweet"), but came second, and in 1981 with the song "Ali-Bábá, um homem das Arábias" ("Ali Baba, a man of the Arabias"), reaching 4th place in the national final. One year later, they won with "Bem bom" ("Very good") and went on the Eurovision Song Contest 1982 to reach the 13th position. There is also an English version of this song, called "Bim Bom", as well as a Spanish version, called "Bingo".

The members were Laura Diogo, Lena Coelho (who later also became an actress), Fátima Padinha (first wife of Pedro Passos Coelho), and Teresa Miguel. Those last two were the female half of the band Gemini who represented Portugal in 1978. Fernanda da Sousa, who would later have notable success in Portugal as Ágata, temporarily replaced Coelho during the latter's pregnancy in 1985 and then replaced Padinha after her departure in the same year.

Discography 
Source:

Albums 

OK KO (LP, Polygram, 1980)
É Demais (LP, Polygram, 1981)

Singles 

"Amanhã de Manhã/Depois de Ti" (Single, Polygram, 1980)
"Doce/Um Beijo Só" (Single, Polygram, 1980)
"OK KO/Doce Caseiro" (Single, Polygram, 1980)
"Ali-Bábá (Um Homem das Arábias)/Jingle Tónico" (Single, Polygram, 1981)
"É Demais/Dói-dói" (Single, Polygram, 1981)
"Bem Bom/Perfumada" (Single, Polygram, 1982)
"For The Love Of Conchita/Choose Again" (Single, Polygram, 1983)
"Starlight/Stepping Stone" (Single, Polygram, 1983)
"Quente, Quente, Quente/Eu e o meu namorado" (Single, Polygram, 1984)
"O Barquinho da Esperança/A história do barquinho" (Single, Polygram, 1984)
“Bem Bom“ (CD, Universal Music Portugal, 2003)

The Compilations 
Doce 1979-1987  (Compilation, Polygram, 1986)
15 anos Depois (Compilation, Universal, 2002), CD
Docemania (Compilation, Universal, 2003), CD/Comp
A Arte E A Música (Compilation, Universal Music Portugal, 2004) CD/Comp
Bandas Míticas || Volume 24 (Compilation, Levoir, 2011) CD/Comp
Os Maiores Êxitos Das Doce (Compilation, Lisbon Records, N.D) LP/Album/Comp

References

Eurovision Song Contest entrants for Portugal
Eurovision Song Contest entrants of 1982
Portuguese girl groups
Portuguese musical groups